Journey into the Whirlwind is the English title of the  memoir by Eugenia Ginzburg. It was published in English in 1967, some thirty years after the story begins.

The two-part book is a highly detailed first-hand account of her life and imprisonment in the Soviet Union during the rule of Joseph Stalin in the 1930s. Although Ginzburg sought to have the manuscript published in the Soviet Union, she was turned down. The manuscript was smuggled out of the country and later sold in many different languages. The first volume was published in 1967 and the second volume was published in 1979  two years after Ginzburg's death. A copy would not be published by a Russian publisher until 1990.

In the book, Ginzburg discusses a variety of her experiences.  Throughout her experiences with the Gulag, Ginzburg was able to form friendships, cultivate a love of poetry and reunite with her son Vasily Aksyonov, after her release. Readers have found these messages to be powerful and inspiring. Ginzburg wrote a sequel, Within the Whirlwind that continues from the point where she left off in the first instalment of her autobiography.

It was republished in the UK by Persephone Books in 2014 as Into the Whirlwind.

The sequel to this book is Within the Whirlwind, which was published two years after Ginzburg's death.

References

Books about Soviet repression
1967 non-fiction books